The Adulteration of Coffee Act 1718 (5 Geo. 1 c. 11) was an Act of Parliament of the Parliament of Great Britain concerning the adulteration of coffee, which made it illegal to debase coffee.

History
It was passed in 1718. The Act provided a penalty of  "against divers [diverse] evil-disposed persons who at the time or soon after roasting of coffee, make use of water, grease, butter, or such like material whereby the same is made unwholesome and greatly increased in weight, to the prejudice of His Majesty's Revenue, the health of his subjects, and to the loss of all fair and honest dealers."

When coffee fell out of fashion, in favour of tea, a similar law was then introduced, the Adulteration of Tea Act 1776 (see List of Acts of the Parliament of Great Britain, 1760–1779).

When recent Governor of Ceylon Viscount Torrington presented a petition in 1854 to similar, reinforcing effect, namely to counter the use of chicory for mixing—as coffee was by 1854 subject to a duty of 75% on top of the London market price—he stressed another piece of legislation had strong effect. He also mentioned coffee as the main export item at that time of Ceylon. This reinforcement was the Act of the 43rd year of George III (chapter 129) (the Excise Act 1803) such that no vegetable substance resembling coffee was permitted on the premises of licensed coffee dealers.

The Act was repealed by the Statute Law Revision Act 1958.

See also

References

Coffee Adulterants And Substitutes

Great Britain Acts of Parliament 1718
History of coffee
Food law
Adulteration
Repealed Great Britain Acts of Parliament